Sartre and his Predecessors: The Self and the Other is a 1984 book by William R. Schroeder, in which the author provides an explanation and critical examination of the thought of Jean-Paul Sartre, Martin Heidegger, Edmund Husserl and Georg Wilhelm Friedrich Hegel.

References 

1984 non-fiction books
Continental philosophy literature
Works about Jean-Paul Sartre
Works about Martin Heidegger
Works about Edmund Husserl
Books about Georg Wilhelm Friedrich Hegel